Janet Helen Rosemary Craxton (17 May 192918 July 1981) was an English oboe player and teacher.  She was the youngest of the six children and the only daughter of the pianist and teacher Harold Craxton.  Her older brothers included the artist John Craxton.  She married the composer Alan Richardson in 1961.

Janet Craxton studied at the Royal Academy of Music from 1945 to 1948 and at the Paris Conservatoire from 1948 to 1949.  She was principal oboist of the Hallé Orchestra from 1949 to 1952, the London Mozart Players from 1952 to 1954, the BBC Symphony Orchestra  from 1954 to 1963, the London Sinfonietta from 1969 to 1981, and the orchestra of the Royal Opera House from 1979 to 1981.  She was appointed oboe professor at the Royal Academy of Music in 1958.

She was much in demand as a soloist, and gave world premières of works by Ralph Vaughan Williams, Lennox Berkeley,  Alan Rawsthorne, Elisabeth Lutyens, Elizabeth Maconchy, Richard Stoker and Priaulx Rainier. In 1958, she was co-dedicatee and original performer with the tenor Wilfred Brown of Ralph Vaughan Williams' song cycle Ten Blake Songs. At a memorial concert at Aylesbury in 1978, she performed the first oboe concerto by Rutland Boughton.

References

External links
Craxton Memorial Trust: Janet Craxton
Oboe Classics: Janet Craxton
Craxton Studios: A Short History

1929 births
1981 deaths
English classical oboists
Alumni of the Royal Academy of Music
Academics of the Royal Academy of Music
20th-century classical musicians
20th-century English musicians
Women oboists
20th-century English women musicians
Women music educators